Peggy Hsu (born 2 February 1981) is a Taiwanese singer-songwriter, music composer, and music producer.  She is the founder and lead vocalist/keyboardist of the band "Le Cirque".

Since her first appearance on the Mandarin music scene in 2001 with her self-written-and-produced debut album, Balloon, written when she was only 19 on her piano, Peggy has picked up Best Songwriter, Best Newcomer, Best Lyricist and other awards from the China, Hong Kong, Taiwan, Singapore and Malaysia market. Since 2009, she has been publishing her own music independently and now she is working closely with Wonder Music, a widely recognized Taiwanese indie record label. She has also written and composed a large number of songs for other Mandarin artists. Her recent works tend to be indie-pop and bossa-nova, jazz based style. In 2003, Peggy formed her own band called "Le Cirque".

In 2007, Peggy Hsu won the 18th Best Music Album Producer of Taiwan's Golden Melody Awards– an equivalent of America's Grammy Awards.

Discography

Albums
 (2001) Balloon (气球)
 (2007) Peggy's Wish Box (許願盒)
 (2009) Beautiful (美好的)
 (2009) Snowman (雪人)
 (2010) Le Cirque (馬戲團1號) (Mini Album)
 (2011) Magical Shop (奇幻精品店)
 (2014) La Valse (圓舞曲)
 (2015) Swing Inc. (搖擺電力公司)
 (2019) Hypnocity (失物之城)

Awards

External links

  The Official Website of Peggy Hsu
  The Secret Garden of Peggy Hsu
  Official Facebook Fan Page
  Official Chinese Weibo

1981 births
Living people
Musicians from Taipei
Taiwanese Mandopop singer-songwriters
21st-century Taiwanese singers
21st-century Taiwanese women singers